Xaçmazqışlaq (also, Khachmaskyshlak, Khachmazkyshlak, Xaçmaz-Qışlaq, Khachmas-Kyshlak, and Khachmaz-Kyshlak) is a village and municipality in the Oghuz Rayon of Azerbaijan.  It has a population of 548.

References 

Populated places in Oghuz District